Villa Kulild (born 31 March 1964) is a Norwegian civil servant.

Kulild worked for around 20 years in the Ministry of Petroleum and Energy, eventually becoming acting permanent under-secretary of state. She resigned her position in the ministry on 7 December 2008 after Dagens Næringsliv reported that she had started up her own investment firm which included investments in oil companies.

In 2009 she became deputy director of the Norwegian Agency for Development Cooperation, and was named as the new director in November 2010.

References

1964 births
Living people
Norwegian civil servants
Directors of government agencies of Norway
Norwegian School of Economics alumni
University of Bergen alumni